Trestonia fulgurata is a species of beetle in the family Cerambycidae. It was described by Buquet in 1859. It is known from Guadeloupe. It feeds on Inga ingoides.

References

fulgurata
Beetles described in 1859